James Dominic Frain is an English stage and screen actor. His best known television roles include Thomas Cromwell in the Showtime/CBC  historical drama The Tudors (2007–2009), Franklin Mott in the HBO drama True Blood (2010), Warwick the Kingmaker in the BBC drama serial The White Queen (2013), John Sumner in the Sky/Canal+ crime drama The Tunnel (2013), Ferdinand Chevalier in the BBC/Space sci-fi thriller Orphan Black (2015–2017), Theo Galavan/Azrael in Fox's Gotham (2015–2016), and Sarek in Star Trek: Discovery (2017–2019). He also played leading roles in the BBC dramas Armadillo (2001), The Buccaneers (1995) and The Mill on the Floss (1997).

In film, he is best known for playing Daniel Barenboim and Álvaro de la Quadra in the biographical dramas Hilary and Jackie and Elizabeth, respectively (both 1998), Bassianus in the Shakespeare adaptation Titus (1999), and Gérard de Villefort in the historical drama The Count of Monte Cristo (2002).

Early life
Frain was born in Leeds, West Riding of Yorkshire, and brought up in Stansted Mountfitchet, near Bishop's Stortford,Essex, the eldest of eight children of a teacher mother and a stockbroker father.  He was educated at Newport Free Grammar School, studied Drama and Film at the University of East Anglia and trained as an actor at the Central School of Speech and Drama in London.

Career
In 1993, while in his final year of drama school, he made his film debut in Shadowlands, after being spotted by the film director Richard Attenborough. In 1995, He starred as a Northern Irish terrorist in the Thaddeus O'Sullivan directed film, Nothing Personal.

In 2000, Frain was nominated for Canadian Screen Award for Best Supporting Actor at the Academy of Canadian Cinema and Television's 20th Genie Awards in Toronto, for his performance as Gustave Sonnenschein in the István Szabó directed film Sunshine. 

He has been a regular on the stage in the United Kingdom, appearing with the Royal Shakespeare Company and Royal Court Theatre, as well as on the West End. He has also appeared on Broadway and was a recipient of the 2008 Drama Desk Award for Outstanding Ensemble Performances along with the rest of the cast of The Homecoming (2007).

He has appeared in a number of television series, such as Soldier Soldier (1993); Armadillo (2001); 24 (2005); Invasion (2006); and The Closer (2006). His more recent roles include Thomas Cromwell in Showtime's The Tudors; the villainous billionaire 'Chess' in the NBC superhero/crime drama series The Cape; heroic Templar Sir Gregory in the Syfy original film Dark Relic (2010); and vampire Franklin Mott in the HBO drama True Blood. In season 2 of Grimm, Frain joined the cast as a mysterious recurring character named Eric Renard.

He appeared in the second season of Gotham as Azrael, and portrayed Sarek, the father of Spock, on Star Trek: Discovery, the second prequel TV series in the Star Trek franchise.

Personal life
In 2004, Frain married director Marta Cunningham; they have two children.

Filmography

Film

Television

Video games

Theatre

References

External links

Hamilton Hodell Profile

1968 births
Alumni of the University of East Anglia
Alumni of the Royal Central School of Speech and Drama
Royal Shakespeare Company members
English male film actors
English male stage actors
English male television actors
Living people
20th-century English male actors
21st-century English male actors
Male actors from Essex
People educated at Hockerill Anglo-European College
People educated at Newport Free Grammar School
English male Shakespearean actors
People from Stansted Mountfitchet
Male actors from Leeds